A statue of Elvis Presley is installed in Seattle, in the U.S. state of Washington.

See also
 List of memorials to Elvis Presley

References

Capitol Hill, Seattle
Cultural depictions of Elvis Presley
Monuments and memorials in Seattle
Statues in Seattle
Statues of musicians in the United States